WBIY (88.3 FM) is a radio station licensed to LaBelle, Florida, United States. The station is owned by the Association des Haitiens Vivant a l'Etranger pour le Develop.

References

External links
 
 

BIY